Peter Johnston (January 19, 1831October 3, 1904) was a Scottish American immigrant, businessman, and Republican politician.  He was the first mayor of Manitowoc, Wisconsin, and represented Manitowoc County in the Wisconsin State Assembly during the 1877 session.

Biography
Johnston was born on January 19, 1831, in Dunblane, Scotland. Later, he resided in Milwaukee, Wisconsin, before settling in Manitowoc, Wisconsin, in 1857. He died on October 3, 1904.

Political career
Johnston was a member of the Assembly during the 1877 session. From 1870 to 1872, he was Mayor of Manitowoc. Additionally, Johnston was a member of the Manitowoc City Council and the Manitowoc County Board of Supervisors. He was a Republican.

References

People from Dunblane
Scottish emigrants to the United States
Politicians from Milwaukee
People from Manitowoc, Wisconsin
Republican Party members of the Wisconsin State Assembly
Mayors of places in Wisconsin
Wisconsin city council members
County supervisors in Wisconsin
1831 births
1904 deaths
Burials in Wisconsin
19th-century American politicians